is a Japanese former actor, singer, and model. Hamao debuted as an actor in the role of Eiji Kikumaru in Musical: The Prince of Tennis from 2007 to 2009. He has since then appeared in multiple film and television projects, such as Takumi Hayama in the Takumi-kun film adaptations and Agri/Gosei Black in Tensou Sentai Goseiger. In addition to his acting career, Hamao has released the songs "Kimi o Mitsuketai" and "Shine", along with his 2011 debut studio album, 7 Colors.

In 2013, Hamao announced that he was retiring from the entertainment industry at the end of February 2014, with no intentions of returning.

Career

Acting career

At the age of 16, Hamao was cast as Eiji Kikumaru in Musical: The Prince of Tennis in 2007, who he played until 2009. In 2008, he appeared in his first television role on Gokusen 3. From 2009, Hamao starred in the Takumi-kun Series: Niji-iro no Glass film adaptation as Takumi Hayama.

In 2010, Hamao was cast as Agri/Gosei Black in Tensou Sentai Goseiger. After the series' run, he continued to appear as the character in other Super Sentai series. Hamao also reprised his role in the Takumi-kun film adaptations until the fifth film, Takumi-kun Series: Ano, Hareta Aozora, after which he announced that he was leaving the project.

On October 25, 2013, Hamao announced on his Niconico live-stream that he was retiring from acting at the end of February 2014. In November 2013, he posted on his blog that he was planning on pursuing interior design. In a 2016 blog post, Hamao revealed that he was studying abroad in the United States and reaffirmed that he had no intentions of returning to the entertainment industry.

Music career

Throughout his career, Hamao briefly pursued singing and released music through the label Marvelous AQL. He released his debut single, "Kimi o Mitsuketai", on August 5, 2009. On May 25, 2011, he released both his second single "Shine" and debut studio album, 7 Colors, on an independent record label.

Discography

Studio albums

Singles

Filmography

Television

Films
Gokusen Movie (2009) as Kyousuke Terauchi 
Takumi-kun Series 2: Nijiiro no Garasu (2009) as Hayama Takumi
Takumi-kun Series 3: Bibou no Detail (2010) as Hayama Takumi
Takumi-kun Series 4: Pure (2010) as Hayama Takumi
Takumi-kun Series 5: Ano, Hareta Aozora (2011) as Hayama Takumi
Samurai Sentai Shinkenger vs. Go-onger: GinmakuBang!!  Gosei Black (voice only)
Tensou Sentai Goseiger: Epic on the Movie (2010) As Agri/Gosei Black
Tensou Sentai Goseiger vs. Shinkenger: Epic on Ginmaku (2011) As Agri/Gosei Black
Gokaiger Goseiger Super Sentai 199 Hero Great Battle (2011) As Agri/Gosei Black
Gal Basara: Sengoku Jidai wa Kengai Desu (2011) as Youhei
Joshidaisei Kaiki Club (2012)
Musashino-sen no Shimai (2012)
Messiah Movie (2013) as Shiba Shuusuke
Our Kogen Hotel/Bokutachi no Kogen Hotel (2013) as Aizawa Ayumu
Fumoukaigi - A Barren Conference (2014)
Taekwondo Damashii: Rebirth (2014)
Gakuen no Kuroba (2014) as Natsume sensei

DVD
 Frame17 (2008)
 Maokore 2009: Kimi ni Yell o (2009)
 Sugao no Kyosuke (2010)

Theatre
The Prince of Tennis Musical: The Progressive Match Higa Chuu feat. Rikkai (In Winter of 2007-2008)
The Prince of Tennis Musical: Dream Live 5th (2008)
The Prince of Tennis Musical: The Imperial Presence Hyotei Gakuen feat. Higa Chuu (2008)
The Prince of Tennis Musical: The Treasure Match Shitenhouji feat. Hyotei Gakuen (2008–2009)
The Prince of Tennis Musical: Dream Live 6th (2009)
Peacemaker (2011) as Souji Okita
Angel Eyes (2011)
Sengoku Basara 3 (2011) as Chosokabe Motochika
Working!! (2012) as Souta Takanashi
The Prince of a Wonderful Town (2012)
The Prince of a Wonderful Town - Chapter 2 (2013)
Messiah Stage (2013) as Shiba Shuusuke
Fumoukaigi - A Barren Conference (2014)

Publications

Photo books

References

1991 births
Living people
21st-century Japanese male actors